Gerhard Arentsson Ysing (1603 – 1673), was a Swedish ironmaster and merchant, known as Karlskoga's first industrialist.

Gerhard Arentsson Ysing was a native of Stade, Germany. Ysing practiced in Örebro in the 17th century, and in the 1630s, he acquired the Valåsen Works from Arvid Bengtsson, but Ysing never settled there.

In 1672, he donated a chandelier to the Karlskoga Church. Ysing married twice.

Ysing died in Örebro in 1673.

Notes

References

Works cited 

 
 
 

1603 births
1673 deaths
Swedish landowners
Swedish merchants
Swedish ironmasters
Swedish people of German descent
People from Stade